Dilley is a city in Frio County, Texas, United States. The population was 3,894 at the 2010 census. It is located off Interstate 35 south of the county seat in Pearsall.

Geography

Dilley is located in southern Frio County at  (28.670824, –99.169820). Interstate 35 bypasses the city on the west, with access from Exits 82 through 86. I-35 leads northeast  to San Antonio and south  to Laredo. Texas State Highway 85 passes through the center of town as Leona Street, leading northeast  to Pleasanton and west  to Carrizo Springs.

Demographics

2020 census

As of the 2020 United States census, there were 3,274 people, 886 households, and 585 families residing in the city.

2000 census
As of the census of 2000, there were 3,674 people, 955 households, and 727 families residing in the city. The population density was 1,574.3 people per square mile (608.8/km2). There were 1,158 housing units at an average density of 496.2 per square mile (191.9/km2). The racial makeup of the city was 66.93% White, 10.40% African American, 0.57% Native American, 0.76% Asian, 18.81% from other races, and 2.53% from two or more races. Hispanic or Latino of any race were 72.24% of the population.

There were 955 households, out of which 42.1% had children under the age of 18 living with them, 49.7% were married couples living together, 20.0% had a female householder with no husband present, and 23.8% were non-families. 21.9% of all households were made up of individuals, and 9.2% had someone living alone who was 65 years of age or older. The average household size was 3.00 and the average family size was 3.47.

In the city, the population was spread out, with 27.9% under the age of 18, 13.0% from 18 to 24, 35.5% from 25 to 44, 14.9% from 45 to 64, and 8.8% who were 65 years of age or older. The median age was 29 years. For every 100 females, there were 145.8 males. For every 100 females age 18 and over, there were 166.9 males.

The median income for a household in the city was $19,540, and the median income for a family was $22,021. Males had a median income of $26,825 versus $13,229 for females. The per capita income for the city was $20,475. About 32.6% of families and 35.8% of the population were below the poverty line, including 42.5% of those under age 18 and 31.3% of those age 65 or over.

Education
The city is served by the Dilley Independent School District. The Dilley Independent School District has three schools: Dilley Elementary, Mary Harper Middle School, and Dilley High School.

In popular culture
A highly fictionalized version of Dilley appears in Messiah.

Gallery

Climate
The climate in this area is characterized by hot, humid summers and generally mild to cool winters.  According to the Köppen Climate Classification system, Dilley has a humid subtropical climate, abbreviated "Cfa" on climate maps.

See also
 South Texas Family Residential Center, located in Dilley, the largest immigrant detention center in the United States

References

External links

 City of Dilley official website
 Handbook of Texas Online – Dilley
 Dilley Independent School District

Cities in Texas
Cities in Frio County, Texas